Blaine County is the name of four counties in the United States; each one is named for American statesman and politician James G. Blaine (1830–1893):
 Blaine County, Idaho 
 Blaine County, Montana 
 Blaine County, Nebraska 
 Blaine County, Oklahoma

It is also the name of a fictional county in Grand Theft Auto V: 
 Blaine County, San Andreas